Walter Walker (April 3, 1883October 8, 1956) was a newspaper owner and editor in Colorado who briefly served as Democratic United States Senator in late 1932 after being appointed to fill a vacancy pending a special election.

A native of Marion, Kentucky, Walker was educated in the schools of Marion and moved to Colorado as a young man. He became a resident of Grand Junction, where he began a career in the newspaper business. He became an editor of Grand Junction Daily Sentinel, and eventually became the paper's owner.

When the Ku Klux Klan was revived in the 1920s, Walker became a member. He later came out in opposition to the Klan, which led to members of the group attacking him in the street, but Walker refused to end his anti-Klan activities. Active in the Democratic Party, he was a delegate to the Democratic National Convention in 1924, 1928, and 1932. From 1930 to 1932, he served as chairman of Colorado's Democratic state committee.

In September 1932, Colorado's governor appointed Walker to fill a vacancy in the United States Senate. He ran in the special election to complete the term, but was defeated by Republican nominee Karl C. Schuyler, who was sworn in to office in December. He continued to own and publish the Daily Sentinel and was a delegate to the Democratic National Conventions in 1936, 1940, 1944, 1948, and 1952. In 1936, he was a presidential elector for the ticket of Franklin D. Roosevelt and John Nance Garner.

Walker died in Grand Junction on October 8, 1956. He was buried in Grand Junction's Orchard Mesa Cemetery.

Early life
Walker was born in Marion, Kentucky on April 3, 1883. The son of Robert C. Walker, the owner of the Crittenden Press newspaper, Walter Walker was educated locally, and then moved to Colorado in 1903.

After settling in Grand Junction, Walker worked in the newspaper business, eventually becoming editor, manager, and chief owner of the Grand Junction Daily Sentinel.  Walker's staff included Dalton Trumbo, whom Walker hired as a reporter in 1920, and employed for four years.  In addition to running the newspaper, Walker was a civic activist, and his efforts included management of Grand Junction's successful lyceum.

Political career
During the 1920s revival of the Ku Klux Klan, Walker was an early member. He subsequently turned against the group, and published editorials in opposition. In September 1925, several local Klan leaders including a deputy sheriff and a police officer assaulted Walker as he walked from a barber shop to his newspaper office. Others on the street eventually intervened, and before leaving to seek medical aid Walker informed the Klan members that physical intimidation would not prevent him from continuing his anti-Klan campaign. In 1924, 1928, and 1932, he was a delegate to the Democratic National Convention. From 1930 to 1932 he served as chairman of Colorado's Democratic state committee.

On September 26, 1932, Walker was appointed to the U.S. Senate, temporarily filling the vacancy caused by the death of Charles W. Waterman. He ran in the special election for the remainder of the term, but was defeated by Republican Karl C. Schuyler. Walker served until December 6, 1932, when Schuyler was sworn in.

Later career
Walker resumed his work in the newspaper business following the completion of his Senate service. In 1936, he was again a delegate to the Democratic National Convention. Later that year, he was a presidential elector for the ticket of Franklin D. Roosevelt and John Nance Garner. In 1940, 1944, 1948, and 1952, he was again a delegate to the Democratic National Convention.

Death and burial
Walker died in Grand Junction on October 8, 1956. He was interred at Orchard Mesa Cemetery in Grand Junction.

Family
In November 1903, Walker married Kathie Wood (1882-1971) of Kentucky. They were the parents of a son, Preston (1912-1970).

Legacy
Several Colorado Mesa University facilities are named for Walter Walker, including the soccer field and the reception area at the Moss Performing Arts Center.

In recognition of his advocacy for air service to Grand Junction in the early days of commercial aviation, the Grand Junction Regional Airport was named for Walker from 1942 until its 2007 expansion. The airport's terminal, fire station, and Walker Boulevard are all named in his honor.

The Walter Walker State Wildlife Area near Grand Junction is also named for Walker.

In 2008, statues of Walter Walker and his son Preston were installed at 634 Main Street in Grand Junction as part of the Legends of the Grand Valley project created by several local organizations.

References

Sources

Newspapers

Books

Magazines

Internet

External links

 (Short biography)

1883 births
1956 deaths
Colorado Democrats
Democratic Party United States senators from Colorado
People from Marion, Kentucky
20th-century American politicians